Pablo Vierci (7 July 1950) is a Uruguayan journalist, author and screenwriter.

Selected works
 1979, Los tramoyistas 
 1984, Pequeña historia de una mujer
 1987, Detrás de los árboles 
 2004, 99% asesinado 
 2009, La sociedad de la nieve
 2010, De Marx a Obama
 2011, Artigas La Redota
 2012, El desertor
 2014, Ellas 5
 2016, Tenía que sobrevivir (with Roberto Canessa)
 2018, El fin de la inocencia

Awards
 2003: Citi Journalistic Excellence Award.
Premio Libro de Oro

References

External links
 

1950 births
Uruguayan people of Italian descent
People from Montevideo
Uruguayan journalists
Uruguayan writers
Uruguayan autobiographers
Uruguayan screenwriters
Living people